Oh Chang-hyun (born May 4, 1989) is a South Korean football player who plays for Daejeon Citizen in the K League Challenge.

References

External links

1989 births
Living people
Association football defenders
South Korean footballers
South Korean expatriate footballers
J2 League players
Avispa Fukuoka players
V-Varen Nagasaki players
Expatriate footballers in Japan
South Korean expatriate sportspeople in Japan
Seoul E-Land FC players
K League 2 players
Daejeon Hana Citizen FC players
Kwangwoon University alumni